Madurai Meenakshi may refer to:

 Madurai Meenakshi temple
 Madurai Meenakshi (goddess)
 Madurai Meenakshi (film)